XSPORT is a Ukrainian multisport TV channel. It began test broadcasting on January 16, 2012, and full-fledged broadcasting on January 22. Until June 10, 2013, it was a monosport television channel: "Hockey," which also included the news online portal xsport.ua

History 

On June 1, 2011, the National Council of Ukraine on Television and Radio Broadcasting at a meeting decided to issue a satellite broadcasting license to Totveld LLC. The logo and name of the channel according to the application were “Hockey”. Then it was announced that the channel would begin broadcasting “in January - February 2012”. On August 18, 2011, the channel won the National Council competition, and received a license for digital broadcasting.

At the end of May 2013, the owner of the channel decided to renew the license and change the channel name to “XSPORT”, as well as expand the broadcasting concept, showing not only hockey, but also other sporting events.  On June 10, 2013, the channel was officially rebranded.

XSPORT positions itself as the only Ukrainian multisport channel promoting a healthy lifestyle. The mission of the channel is to draw attention to Ukrainian sports. Along with classic sports - hockey, boxing, martial arts, athletics, tennis, swimming, handball - the channel offers its viewers sports-themed films, extreme sports and sport fishing programs.

Due to many factors, such as the war in the east of Ukraine, the difficult economic situation in the country, and the instability of the exchange rate, the XSPORT channel decided on January 1, 2015, to suspend its own television broadcasting. First of all, such measures were associated with the inability to allocate a budget for purchasing high-quality foreign content, which would have had to be done in foreign currency. Thus, the channel suspended broadcasting to optimize technical costs. As for online broadcasting and the official site of the XSPORT channel, such a decision did not affect their work. The online resource continued to inform Ukrainian fans about sporting events in Ukraine and around the world.

On April 13, 2016, XSPORT resumed broadcasting on the satellite and on the T2 digital network after a forced pause.

On November 9, 2017, the channel updated the logo and graphic design, which were then in yellow and blue colors.

Broadcasting
This channel is included in the digital pack DVB-T2, since it won the contest for getting into the nationwide multiplexes. It is also broadcast in packages of the largest cable operators in Ukraine: Volya, Triolan, Megogo, and others.

Satellite broadcasting 
1.1. Satellite (SD format)

Orbital position 5° E

Satellite ASTRA 4A

Frequency 12245 MHz Vertical

Symbol rate 30,000  FEC 2/3
Scrambled Verimatrix (B)

Software grid

Broadcasts 

 Hockey: World Cup 2019, Championship of Ukraine
 Boxing: Union Boxing Promotion, Sparta Boxing Promotions, KOTV Classics
 MMA: MMA Pro Ukraine, Mix Fight Promotions, Relocation Promotion, Mixed Martial Arts Federation of Ukraine
 Basketball: Ukrainian Championship, Eurobasket
 Handball: European Championship 2016
 Cybersport

Programs 
• XSPORT news

• "Yak ya stav khokeyistom"

• Fight life

• Lookout UHL

• Fight club

• XSPORT Moto

• XSPORT vlog

• "Ukrayina futbolʹna"

• Our Tenis

• Hour of Champions

• XSPORT studio

External links
 XSPORT: official site

References

Television stations in Ukraine
Ukrainian-language television stations in Ukraine
Sports television networks
Ukrainian sport websites